TASS is a major news agency in Russia, successor to the Telegraph Agency of the Soviet Union (Telegrafnoye agentstvo Sovetskogo Soyuza).

TASS or Tass may also refer to:

Places
 Tass River, South Island, New Zealand; a river
 Tass, Hungary, a village in Bács-Kiskun county
 Nyírtass, Szabolcs-Szatmár-Bereg county, Hungary; a village; formerly Tass

People
 Atilio Tass (born 1957), Argentinian fencer
 Matthias Tass (born 1999), Estonian basketball player
 Nadia Tass, Greek filmmaker
 Olga Tass (1929–2020) Hungarian gymnast
 Richard Tass, U.S. politician
 Anastasios Tass Repousis, Australian dancer

Technology
 Tactical Automated Security System, a U.S. Air Force intrusion detection and surveillance system 
 Tass Times in Tonetown, a video game
 Tilt Authorisation and Speed Supervision, a  system to provide tilting information for trains
 Trading Advisor Selection System, database for hedge funds

Other
 USAF Tactical Air Support Squadron (disambiguation)
 List of current USAF Tactical Air Support Squadrons
 Talented Athlete Scholarship Scheme, youth sport scheme in England
 Technical, Administrative and Supervisory Section, a former British trade union
 Toxic anterior segment syndrome, an inflammation in the eye's interior
 Telluride Association Sophomore Seminar, a six-week seminar free educational program for schoolchildren in the United States

See also